Halogeton sativus is a species of flowering plant in the family Amaranthaceae. It is native to Spain, Morocco and Algeria. Rich in salt, in the past it was cultivated to produce soda ash for glass-makers.

References

Amaranthaceae
Halophytes